Glantz is a surname. Notable people with the surname include:

 Aaron Glantz (1977–), an American journalist and author
 Abraham Glantz (1907–1998), South African cricketer
 David Glantz (1942–), an American military historian
 Ezra Glantz (1945–), an American handball goalkeeper
 Leib Glantz (1898–1964), a Ukrainian lyrical tenor
 Margo Glantz (1930–), a Mexican writer, essayist, critic, and academic
 Matthew Glantz (1971–), an American professional poker player
 Nathan Glantz, an American jazz bandleader
 Peter Glantz (1975–), an American director of theater and film
 Stanton Glantz (1946–), a professor of medicine at the University of California, San Francisco